
Gmina Lipnica Wielka is a rural gmina (administrative district) in Nowy Targ County, Lesser Poland Voivodeship, in southern Poland, on the Slovak border. It also contains the village of Kiczory.

Neighbouring gminas
Gmina Lipnica Wielka is bordered by the gminas of Jabłonka and Zawoja. It also borders Slovakia.

References
Polish official population figures 2006

Lipnica Wielka
Nowy Targ County